The 2022 FIA Motorsport Games GT Cup was the second FIA Motorsport Games GT Cup, held at Circuit Paul Ricard, France on 26 October to 30 October 2022. The race was contested with GT3-spec cars. Only Silver and Bronze drivers were allowed to compete. The event was part of the 2022 FIA Motorsport Games.

Entry list

Results

Qualifying 1

Qualifying 2

Qualifying Race 1

Notes
  – CAR 4 - 10 SEC. TIME PENALTY - CONTACT WITH CAR 54
  – CAR 81 - 5 SEC. TIME PENALTY - TRACK LIMITS

Qualifying Race 2

Notes
  – CAR 19 - 5 SEC. TIME PENALTY - TRACK LIMITS
  – CAR 81 - 5 SEC. TIME PENALTY - TRACK LIMITS
  – CAR 51 - 5 SEC. TIME PENALTY - TRACK LIMITS
  – Following stewards decision no. 28 a time penalty of 10 seconds for car no. 51

Points

Main Race

Notes
  – CAR 44 - 10 SEC: TIME PENALTY - CAUSED A COLLISION
  – CAR 44 - ADDITIONAL 5 SEC. TIME PENALTY - TRACK LIMITS

References

External links

GT Cup